Medical gowns are hospital gowns worn by medical professionals as personal protective equipment (PPE) in order to provide a barrier between patient and professional. Whereas patient gowns are flimsy often with exposed backs and arms, PPE gowns, as seen below in the cardiac surgeon photograph, cover most of the exposed skin surfaces of the professional medics.

In several countries, PPE gowns for use in the COVID-19 pandemic became in appearance more like cleanroom suits as knowledge of the best practices filtered up through the national bureaucracies. For example, the European norm-setting bodies CEN and CENELEC on 30 March 2020 in collaboration with the European Commissioner for the Internal Market made freely-available the relevant standards documents in order "to tackle the severe shortage of protective masks, gloves and other products currently faced by many European countries. Providing free access to the standards will facilitate the work of the many companies wishing to reconvert their production lines in order to manufacture the equipment that is so urgently needed."

History
The concept of PPE in regards to medical professionals was seen as early as the 17th century Plague doctor's outfit.

During the Ebola crisis of 2014, the WHO published a rapid advice guideline on PPE coveralls.

Types 
The different levels of various gown types are categorized as follows:

Local variants

United States
In the United States, medical gowns are medical devices regulated by the Food and Drug Administration.  FDA divides medical gowns into three categories.  A surgical gown is intended to be worn by health care personnel during surgical procedures.  Surgical isolation gowns are used when there is a medium to high risk of contamination and a need for larger critical zones of protection.  Non-surgical gowns are worn in low or minimal risk situations.

Surgical and surgical isolation gowns are regulated by the FDA as a Class II medical device that require a 510(k) premarket notification, but non-surgical gowns are Class I devices exempt from premarket review.  Surgical gowns only require protection of the front of the body due to the controlled nature of surgical procedures, while surgical isolation gowns and non-surgical gowns require protection over nearly the entire gown.

In 2004, the FDA recognized ANSI/AAMI PB70:2003 standard on protective apparel and drapes for use in health care facilities.  Surgical gowns must also conform to the ASTM F2407 standard for tear resistance, seam strength, lint generation, evaporative resistance, and water vapor transmission.  Because surgical gowns are considered to be a surface-contacting device with intact skin, FDA recommends that cytotoxicity, sensitization, and irritation or intracutaneous reactivity is evaluated.

China
The First Affiliated Hospital of the Zhejiang University School of Medicine in Hangzhou, Zhejiang Province, People's Republic of China developed their own protocol and equipment during the early months of the COVID-19 pandemic. A screenshot of the cover of the Handbook of COVID-19 Prevention and Treatment shows a picture of two rows of medical personnel, each wearing PPE gowns and PPE masks and PPE hoods and PPE goggles.

During the COVID-19 pandemic in Wuhan, doctors were provided with full PPE gown suits as early as January 2020.

European Union
During the COVID-19 pandemic, the European Commissioner for the Internal Market on 30 March 2020 listed the applicable norms for to help manufacturers re-convert their production lines:
Protective masks
EN 1492009-08: Respiratory protective devices – Filtering half masks to protect against particles - Requirements, testing, marking
EN 146832019-10: Medical face masks - Requirements and test methods
Eye protection
EN 1662002-04: Personal eye-protection – Specifications
Protective clothing
EN 141262004-01: Protective clothing - Performance requirements and tests methods for protective clothing against infective agents
EN 146052009-08: Protective clothing against liquid chemicals - performance requirements for clothing with liquid-tight (Type 3) or spray-tight (Type 4) connections, including items providing protection to parts of the body only (Types PB [3] and PB [4])
EN ISO 136882013-12 Protective clothing - General requirements (ISO 13688:2013)
EN 13795-12019-06: Surgical clothing and drapes - Requirements and test methods – Part 1: Surgical drapes and gowns
EN 13795-22019-06: Surgical clothing and drapes - Requirements and test methods – Part 2: Clean air suits
Gloves
EN 455-12001-01 Medical gloves for single use – Part 1: Requirements and testing for freedom from holes
EN 455-22015-07: Medical gloves for single use – Part 2: Requirements and testing for physical properties
EN 455-32015-07: Medical gloves for single use – Part 3: Requirements and testing for biological evaluation
EN 455-42009-10: Medical gloves for single use – Part 4: Requirements and testing for shelf life determination
EN 4202010-03: Protective gloves - General requirements and test methods
EN ISO 374-12018-10 Protective gloves against dangerous chemicals and micro-organisms – Part 1: Terminology and performance requirements for chemical risks
EN ISO 374-52017-03: Protective gloves against dangerous chemicals and micro-organisms – Part 5: Terminology and performance requirements for micro-organisms risks (ISO 374-5:2016)

Israel
As seen in the accompanying gallery figure, at least one Israeli hospital had access to full Tyvek PPE gowns as early as 17 March 2020 during the COVID-19 pandemic.

Italy
In an early April article, 20 doctors from the whole of Italy describe their experience with coronavirus patient care. Their conclusion reads:

Their findings are set out in a table entitled "Necessary personal protection equipment":
FFP2 facial mask or (in case of maneuvers at high risk of generating aerosolized particles:) FFP3 facial mask
Disposable long sleeve waterproof coats, gowns, or Tyvek suits
Disposable double pair of nitrile gloves
Protective goggles or visors
Disposable head caps
Disposable long shoe covers
Alcoholic hand hygiene solution

Criticisms
In a May 2017 research article, several French scientists complained that there was little harmonization across Europe for the names of pathogens, and went on to describe the PPE norms and regulations in France for infectious diseases under BSL-3.

See also
, historical equivalent
Hazmat suit
Workplace hazard controls for COVID-19

References

Gowns
Medical equipment
 
Headgear
 
Occupational safety and health
Risk management in business
Industrial hygiene
Environmental social science
Working conditions
Personal protective equipment